Healy is a station on Metra's Milwaukee District North Line in the Hermosa community area of Chicago, Illinois. In Metra's zone-based fare system, Healy is in zone B. As of 2018, Healy is the 140th busiest of Metra's 236 non-downtown stations, with an average of 323 weekday boardings. It is just south of the factories of Newly Weds Foods. The station is named after the Lyon & Healy Harps, Inc., a world-renowned harp manufacturer founded in Chicago in 1864 by George W. Lyon and Patrick J. Healy. Now headquartered on Ogden Avenue, the company was located near the station at 4014 W. Fullerton Ave. until 1914.

Street-side parking is only available on the north side of West Fullerton Avenue just west of where it runs beneath the tracks. A freight spur exists north of the station.

On May 8, 2017, Metra broke ground on a major renovation of Healy station, including new platforms, heated shelters, improved access for the disabled, and LED lighting.  The makeover will cost $7.3 million and is expected to increase ridership given the station's close proximity to the 606 Trail.

As of December 12, 2022, Healy is served by 40 trains (19 inbound, 21 outbound) on weekdays, by all 20 trains (10 in each direction) on Saturdays, and by all 18 trains (nine in each direction) on Sundays and holidays.

Bus connections
CTA
  53 Pulaski (Owl Service) 
  74 Fullerton

References

External links 

Fullerton Avenue entrance from Google Maps Street View

Metra stations in Chicago
Former Chicago, Milwaukee, St. Paul and Pacific Railroad stations